The 2015 FIL Rathbones Women's U-19 World Lacrosse Championship was the sixth FIL Women's Under-19 World Lacrosse Championship, an international field lacrosse tournament that is held every four years and is sponsored by the Federation of International Lacrosse. It took place from 23 July to 1 August 2015 in Edinburgh, Scotland. The games were played at the University of Edinburgh – Peffermill Playing Fields. The Canadian team won its first world championship at this event in defeating the United States in the final.

Preliminary round
Fifteen nations were set to participate in the championship; however the Haudenosaunee Nationals team withdrew on the eve of the tournament, due to issues regarding the acceptance of their national passport by UK authorities. The fourteen participating teams were placed in three groups. After playing a round-robin, all five teams from Pool A advanced to the championship round along with the top three seeded teams from Pools B and C. The remaining six teams in Pools B and C competed in the Platinum Division for placings nine through fourteen.

Pool A

Pool B

Pool C

Pool Play 
All times are local (UTC+1).

Bracket Play

Platinum Division 
All times are local (UTC+2).

Championship Bracket

Quarter finals

Consolation semi finals

Semi finals

Final Placement and Medal Games

13th place playoff

11th place playoff

9th place playoff

7th place playoff

5th place playoff

Bronze medal game

Gold medal game

Ranking and statistics

Final standings
The final standings of the tournament according to the FIL:

References

External links 
 

FIL Women's U-19 World Lacrosse Championship, 2015
FIL Women's U-19 World Lacrosse Championship, 2015
lacrosse
Women's international lacrosse competitions
FIL Women's U-19 World Lacrosse Championship, 2015
FIL Women's U-19 World Lacrosse Championship, 2015
FIL Women's U-19 World Lacrosse Championship
FIL Women's U-19 World Lacrosse Championship
Under-19 World Lacrosse Championships
International lacrosse competitions hosted by the United Kingdom
2010s in Edinburgh